The Star Wars prequel trilogy, colloquially referred to as the prequels, is a series of epic space-opera films written and directed by George Lucas. It was produced by Lucasfilm Ltd. and distributed by 20th Century Fox. The trilogy was released from 1999 to 2005 and is set before the original Star Wars trilogy (1977–83), chronologically making it the first act of the Skywalker saga. Lucas had planned a prequel trilogy (as well as a sequel trilogy) before the release of the original film, but halted major Star Wars films beyond the original trilogy by 1981. When computer-generated imagery (CGI) had advanced to the level he wanted for the visual effects he wanted for subsequent films, Lucas revived plans for the prequels by the early 1990s. The trilogy marked Lucas's return to directing after a 22-year hiatus following the original Star Wars film in 1977, as well as a 16-year hiatus between the classic and prequel trilogies.

The trilogy consists of Episode I – The Phantom Menace (1999), Episode II – Attack of the Clones (2002), and Episode III – Revenge of the Sith (2005). The films follow the training of the powerful youth Anakin Skywalker (the father of the original trilogy protagonists Luke Skywalker and Leia Organa) as a Jedi under the tutelage of Jedi Masters Obi-Wan Kenobi and Yoda, his fall to the dark side of the Force and rebirth as Darth Vader. The trilogy also depicts the corruption of the Galactic Republic, the annihilation of the Jedi Order, and the rise of the Empire under the secret Sith Lord and future Galactic Emperor Palpatine. The first two films received mixed reviews, while the third's reception was more positive.

Background
According to original trilogy producer Gary Kurtz, loose plans for a prequel trilogy were developed during the outlining of the original two films. In 1980, Lucas confirmed that he had the nine-film series plotted, but due to the stress of producing the original trilogy and pressure from his wife to settle down, he had decided to cancel further sequels by 1981.
However, technical advances in the late 1980s and early 1990s, including the ability to create computer-generated imagery (CGI), inspired Lucas to consider that it might be possible to revisit his saga. In 1989, Lucas stated that the prequel trilogy would be "unbelievably expensive." After viewing an early CGI test created by Industrial Light & Magic for Jurassic Park, Lucas said:
We did a test for Steven Spielberg; and when we put them up on the screen I had tears in my eyes. It was like one of those moments in history, like the invention of the lightbulb or the first telephone call. A major gap had been crossed and things were never going to be the same.

In 1992, Lucas acknowledged that he had plans to create the prequel trilogy in the Lucasfilm Fan Club magazine, and announced this to Variety in late 1993. Producer Rick McCallum reached out to Frank Darabont, who had previously written The Young Indiana Jones Chronicles and The Shawshank Redemption, for possible future writing duties. He was considered until at least 1995, but as time went on, Lucas continued writing the screenplays himself. Before Lucas chose to direct the prequels, Return of the Jedi director Richard Marquand expressed interest on directing one of the prequel films, up until his death in 1987. The popularity of the franchise had been prolonged by the Star Wars Expanded Universe, so that it still had a large audience. A theatrical rerelease of the original trilogy in 1997 'updated' the 20-year-old films with the style of CGI envisioned for the new episodes.

Films
Having been significantly anticipated by fans, Star Wars: Episode I – The Phantom Menace was released on May 19, 1999. It sees the Jedi coming into contact with the young Anakin Skywalker and the corruption of the Galactic Senate by Palpatine (Darth Sidious). Episode II – Attack of the Clones was released on May 16, 2002. The story jumps ahead 10 years and finds Anakin—now a Jedi apprentice of Obi-Wan Kenobi—pursuing a forbidden romance, as well as the outbreak of the Clone Wars. Episode III – Revenge of the Sith, the first  film in the franchise, was released on May 19, 2005. It depicts Anakin's fall to the dark side of the Force and his rebirth as Darth Vader.

Episode I – The Phantom Menace

32 years before the events of the original film, two Jedi Knights—Qui-Gon Jinn and his apprentice Obi-Wan Kenobi—discover that the corrupt Trade Federation has formed a blockade around the planet Naboo. Naboo's senator Palpatine—who is secretly the Sith Lord Darth Sidious—has covertly engineered the blockade as a pretext to become Supreme Chancellor of the Galactic Republic. With the help of Naboo's fourteen-year-old queen, Padmé Amidala, and accompanied by a clumsy native named Jar Jar Binks, Qui-Gon and Obi-Wan escape the blockade. They land on Tatooine to repair their starship, and meet a nine-year-old slave named Anakin Skywalker. Believing him to be the prophesied "Chosen One", Qui-Gon takes Anakin to be trained as a Jedi.

The prequels were originally planned to fill in history tangential to the original trilogy, but Lucas realized that they could form the first half of one long story focusing on Anakin. This would shape the film series into a self-contained saga. In 1994, Lucas began writing the screenplay for the first prequel, initially titled Episode I: The Beginning. Following the film's release, Lucas announced that he would be directing the next two.

Episode II – Attack of the Clones

10 years later, an assassination attempt is made on Padmé Amidala, who is now serving as Naboo's senator after finishing her term as queen. Jedi Knight  and his apprentice, Anakin, are assigned to protect her;  tracks the assassin, while Anakin and Padmé secretly fall in love. Meanwhile, Chancellor Palpatine schemes to draw the galaxy into the Clone Wars between the Republic army of clone troopers led by the Jedi, and the Confederacy of Independent Systems led by Darth Sidious' Sith apprentice, Count Dooku.

The first draft of Episode II was completed just weeks before principal photography, and Lucas hired Jonathan Hales, a writer from The Young Indiana Jones Chronicles, to polish it. Unsure of a title, Lucas had jokingly called the film "Jar Jar's Great Adventure". In writing The Empire Strikes Back, Lucas initially considered that Lando Calrissian was a clone from a planet of clones which caused the Clone Wars mentioned in A New Hope. He later came up with the concept of an army of clone shock troopers from a remote planet which attacked the Republic and were resisted by the Jedi.

Episode III – Revenge of the Sith

Three years into the Clone Wars, Anakin becomes disillusioned with the Jedi Council and begins to have visions of Padmé dying in childbirth. Palpatine convinces Anakin that the dark side of the Force holds the power to save Padmé's life. Desperate, Anakin submits to Palpatine and assumes the Sith moniker Darth Vader. Palpatine reveals himself as Darth Sidious to the Jedi and orders their extermination while declaring the former Republic an Empire.

Work on Episode III began before Episode II was released, with one scene shot during the earlier film's production. Lucas originally told concept artists that the film would open with a montage of the Clone Wars, and included a scene of Palpatine revealing to Anakin that he had willed his conception through the Force. Lucas reviewed and radically reorganized the plot, having Anakin execute Dooku in the first act to foreshadow his fall to the dark side. After principal photography was completed in 2003, Lucas made more changes, rewriting Anakin's arc. He would now primarily turn to the dark side in a quest to save Padmé, rather than just believing that the Jedi are plotting to take over the Republic. The rewrite was accomplished both through editing principal footage, and filming new and revised scenes during pick-ups in 2004.

Themes
Lucas made a conscious effort to parallel scenes and dialogue between the prequel and original trilogy, especially concerning the journey of Anakin Skywalker in the prequels and that of his son Luke in the older films. Together with the original trilogy, Lucas has collectively referred to the first six episodic films of the franchise as "the tragedy of Darth Vader". According to Lucas, the correct order to watch the films is by episode order.

There are many references to Christianity in the prequel trilogy, such as the appearance of Darth Maul, whose design draws heavily from traditional depictions of the devil, complete with red skin and horns. The Star Wars film cycle features a similar Christian narrative involving Anakin Skywalker; he is the "Chosen One"—the individual prophesied to bring balance to the Force—who was conceived of a virgin birth. However, unlike Jesus, Anakin falls from grace and seemingly fails to fulfill his destiny (until the prophecy comes true in Return of the Jedi). The saga draws heavily from the hero's journey, an archetypical template developed by comparative mythologist Joseph Campbell.

Political science has been an important element of Star Wars since the franchise launched in 1977, focusing on a struggle between democracy and dictatorship.
Palpatine being a chancellor before becoming the Emperor in the prequel trilogy alludes to Adolf Hitler's role as chancellor before appointing himself Führer. Lucas has also drawn parallels between Palpatine and historical dictators such as Julius Caesar and Napoleon Bonaparte, as well as former president of the United States Richard Nixon. The Great Jedi Purge depicted in Revenge of the Sith mirrors the events of the Night of the Long Knives. The corruption of the Galactic Republic is modeled after the fall of the Roman Republic and the formation of an empire.

Re-releases
In 2011, box sets of the original and prequel trilogy were released on Blu-ray, all including alterations.
3D releases were planned for the then-six-film franchise, but after the financially unsuccessful 2012 3D release of The Phantom Menace, the rest were cancelled to focus on the sequels.
The trilogy was made available for streaming on Disney+ upon the service's launch in late 2019.

Reception

Box office performance

Critical response

The prequel trilogy received mixed reviews, generally improving in critical reception with each installment. Common criticisms surrounded the over-reliance on computer-generated imagery and green screens, melodramatic and wooden dialogue (including scenes of romance between Anakin and Padmé), slow-paced political scenes, and the comic relief character of Jar Jar Binks, whose role was reduced after the first film. Several alien characters introduced in The Phantom Menace have been subject to accusations of racial stereotypes. Jar Jar is asserted to caricature a stereotyped Jamaican, while the Gungan species at large has been said to suggest a primitive African tribe. The greedy Neimoidians of the Trade Federation have been noted as resembling East Asian stereotypes with some deliberately given Thai accents, and Watto's mannerisms and hooked nose appearance were based on footage of Alec Guinness as the Jewish character Fagin in the 1948 film Oliver Twist, leading some to assert that the slave-owning character is a Jewish stereotype. Lucas denied all accusations of racial stereotypes.

Many expressed their disappointment with the trilogy's portrayal of Anakin Skywalker, particularly calling the writing weak and the dialogue wooden, although Hayden Christensen's performance in the third film was more well-received. Contrarily, Ewan McGregor's portrayal of Obi-Wan Kenobi, following in the footsteps of Alec Guinness, has been generally praised. Natalie Portman has expressed her disappointment with the trilogy's negative reception, saying that "When something has that much anticipation it can almost only disappoint." She also acknowledged that "With the perspective of time, it's been re-evaluated by a lot of people who actually really love them now."

The trilogy has also received some criticism for clashing aesthetically with the original trilogy. While the older films feature rough and aged technology, the prequels depict relatively sleek and new industrial designs. Some have criticized this design choice by saying that it makes the earlier time period appear to depict a more advanced civilization, although Revenge of the Sith brings the design closer to that of the original trilogy. Lucas has called the choice clever, as it illustrates the halt of technological innovation in a time period of civil war.

Conversely, some argue for the prequel trilogy's positive elements, including its handling of political issues, especially involving the rise of fascism. This includes Star Wars: The Last Jedi director and writer Rian Johnson, who also praised its visual effects innovations. Jar Jar Binks has been regarded as the first fully CGI character in a live-action film, and perceived as paving the way for Gollum in The Lord of the Rings. J. J. Abrams praised the acting of Ian McDiarmid as Darth Sidious, stating that the scene where he recounts the tragedy of Darth Plagueis is the best of the trilogy. In 2020, Screen Rant compared the way the prequel trilogy ended the saga compared to Disney's sequel trilogy, writing, "Amidst the bad execution of the story, the fact of the matter is, the prequel movies tell one coherent narrative, with a clear through-line between movies – this is something sorely lacking in the sequel trilogy."

George Lucas has responded to the negative criticism by saying that, like the original films, they were intended "for 12-year-olds", while acknowledging that fans who saw the originals when they were young had different expectations as adults. The prequels have been noted as retaining a dedicated fanbase, primarily composed of Millennials and Gen Zers who were children at the time of their release. Additionally, the animated The Clone Wars series, which Lucas made with animation artist Dave Filoni, has been noted to have retroactively improved the perception of the prequel trilogy among fans. Since the late 2010s, the prequels have amassed a cult following via memes on social media, with Neel Patel of Syfy Wire attributing this to the internet being a "paradise of irreverence, just like George Lucas' scripts."

Accolades

Academy Awards

References
Footnotes

Citations

Sources

 
 
 

American film series
20th Century Fox films
Lucasfilm films
Prequel trilogy
Trilogies
Film series introduced in 1999
Films directed by George Lucas
Film and television memes